The xiphisternal joint (or xiphisternal symphysis) is a location near the bottom of the sternum, where the body of the sternum and the xiphoid process meet. It is structurally classified as a synchondrosis, and functionally classified as a synarthrosis. This joint can remain until the middle years of life, but usually ossifies to form a synostosis between the two sternal elements.

It is in line with the T9 vertebra.

External links
 Anatomy Expert

Bones of the thorax